Institute of Modern Languages may refer to

 Institute of Modern Languages (Dhaka), Bangladesh
 Institute of Modern Languages (Faisalabad), Pakistan
 Institute of Modern Languages (Queensland), University of Queensland, Australia
 Institute of Modern Languages, University of Chittagong, Bangladesh
 Bourguiba Institute of Modern Languages, Tunis El Manar University, Tunisia